Snake Handlin' Man is a 1995 album by American folk singer Dave Carter.  This was his solo debut prior to his very successful partnership with fiddler, Tracy Grammer (see Dave Carter and Tracy Grammer).  The duo re-recorded "The River Where She Sleeps" for their 1998 album When I Go, and "Cowboy Singer" for their 2000 release, Tanglewood Tree.  Prior to Carter's death in 2002 the duo re-recorded the remaining nine songs and two new songs.  The resulting final album, Seven is the Number was released in 2006.

Track listing 
All songs written by Dave Carter
 "Cowboy Singer" 
 "Snake-Handlin' Man" 
 "Red (Elegy)"
 "The Promised Land" 
 "Hey Tonya"
 "The River Where She Sleeps"
 "Long Black Road Into Tulsa Town" 
 "Texas Underground"
 "Workin' For Jesus"
 "Gun-Metal Eyes"
 "Sarah Turn 'Round"

Credits 
 Dave Carter – vocals, guitar and banjo
 Dana Denton – vocals and percussion
 Arlene Hale – bass and vocals
 Carolyn Laster – accordion and vocals
 Susan Martin; vocals
 Eric Park – harmonica
 Nancy Young-Mathisen – vocals and keys
 Troy Mathisen – Engineer

External links 
 Music page at official Dave Carter and Tracy Grammer web site (lyrics and sound samples)
 Music page at official Tracy Grammer web site (lyrics and sound samples)

Notes and sources 

1995 debut albums
Dave Carter and Tracy Grammer albums
Self-released albums